In computer networking, north-south traffic is network traffic flowing into and out of a data center.

Traffic
Based on the most commonly deployed network topology of systems within a data center, north-south traffic typically indicates data flow that either enters or leaves the data center from/to a system physically residing outside the data center, such as user to server. 

Southbound traffic is data entering the data center (through a firewall and/or other networking infrastructure). Data exiting the data center is northbound traffic, commonly routed through a firewall to Internet space. 

The other direction of traffic flow is east-west traffic which typically indicates data flow within a data center.

See also 
Virtual private network

References 

Data processing
Computer data